The 1965 Texas Tech Red Raiders football team represented Texas Technological College—now known as Texas Tech University—as a member of the Southwest Conference (SWC) during the 1965 NCAA University Division football season. In their fifth season under head coach J. T. King, the Red Raiders compiled an 8–3 record (5–2 against conference opponents), finished in second place in the SWC, lost to Georgia Tech in the 1965 Gator Bowl, and outscored opponents by a combined total of 278 to 222. The team's statistical leaders included Tom Wilson with 2,119 passing yards and Donny Anderson with 705 rushing yards and 797 receiving yards. The team played its home games at Clifford B. & Audrey Jones Stadium.

Schedule

References

Texas Tech
Texas Tech Red Raiders football seasons
Texas Tech Red Raiders football